Pedro Rosa da Conceição was a Brazilian mass murderer and suspected serial killer. He killed three people and wounded thirteen others in Rio das Pedras, Rio de Janeiro, Brazil on April 22, 1904, before his arrest. He killed his cellmate Joaquim Alves Junior and an unnamed guard who attempted to calm him down in 1911. He was also said to have murdered a family of twelve people in Rio das Pedras.

Rio das Pedras mass murder
On April 22, 1904 Rosa, an epileptic, who worked at the Estrada de Ferro Central, armed himself with a bayonet. He then got in a locomotive in the Belém station with a partner, however, when the speed of the train was fast, he pushed him out of the train. When the train stopped in the Rio das Pedras station he stopped from travelling without destiny.

He then walked to the Dona Clara station where his progenitor Ambrosio Gomes lived. With the intention of killing him, he started beating him, and wounded him four times. He also beat his stepmother, Maria da Conceição. He then walked to Rio das Pedras, wounding everyone who crossed his path. Close to the Dona Clara station he stabbed João Teixeira de Oliveira to death. In the side of the road, he found Seraphina Maria, where he wounded her. He then killed farmer Fructuoso Goulart do Amaral and fled. One of his victims, Felicidade Ignacia de Salles, 15, died on April 27.

In the bushes, hidden in the trees, Rosa was arrested the following day. He was sent to the Hospicio dos Alienados.

Victims
Killed were:
Jose Teixeira de Oliveira, 56, corporal
Fructuoso Goulart do Amaral, 44, farmer
Felicidade Ignacia de Salles, 15, died on April 27

Among those wounded were:
Augusto Barreto do Pinho, 56, wounded in the abdomen
Cahilde Luiza da Silva, 18
Conceição Alves Moreira, 21
Maria Florentina da Silva Nobrega
Euphrasia Maria da Conceição
Seraphina Maria

Hospicio Nacional dos Alienados double homicide
On October 1, 1911 Rosa and Joaquim Alves Junior had a fight in the Hospicio Nacional dos Alienados.  Rosa killed Joaquim with an unspecified weapon and also killed an unnamed guard who tried to calm him down.

Murder of twelve people of a family
The newspaper A Noite, chronicling the crimes of Pedro Rosa, claimed that Rosa killed a family of twelve people, in an unspecified date and year.

Death
On February 25, 1919 Rosa died in the Hospicio Nacional dos Alienados, the hospital where he was sent on August 10, 1904.

See also
List of serial killers by country
List of serial killers by number of victims

References

1904 in Brazil
1919 deaths

Brazilian mass murderers
Brazilian serial killers
Family murders
Fugitives
Male serial killers
Mass murder in 1904
Spree killers